Aubrey W. Dirlam (October 20, 1913 – June 3, 1995) was a Minnesota politician and a former member of the Minnesota House of Representatives who represented the old District 14, District 17, District 17A, and District 21B, which included all or portions of 
Brown, Kandiyohi, Redwood, Renville and Yellow Medicine counties in the southwestern part of the state. The district number and boundaries changed through the years due to redistricting.

House service and leadership
First elected in 1940, Dirlam was re-elected every two years until he retired in 1975. During his 34 years in the House, he served as Speaker, Majority Leader and Minority Leader. He was a member of the Legislature at a time when candidates, representatives and leadership positions were officially non-partisan. He allied with the House's Conservative Caucus, and was known to be a Republican.

Dirlam originally sought the House speakership in 1963, but lost the contest by one vote to Lloyd Duxbury, accepting the majority leader position in compensation. He later succeeded Duxbury as Speaker in 1971 and was the last officially nonpartisan Speaker. He had occasion to preside over the longest special session in state history (159 calendar days) that same year after Governor Wendell Anderson called the Legislature back to Saint Paul. After a series of meetings with the governor and Senate Majority Leader Stanley Holmquist, they were able to craft the "Minnesota Miracle," which set a new pattern in the state's financing of education.

Dirlam served as chair of the Agriculture Committee from 1949 to 1955, and as chair of the Rules Committee from 1963 to 1971. He was also a member of the Education, Governmental Operations, Rules and Legislative Administration, and Taxes committees.

Background and later years
Born in Panora, Iowa, Dirlam moved with his family to the Redwood Falls, Minnesota area in 1919, where they farmed. In addition to being a lifelong grain and livestock farmer, he and his family were also involved with a meat and locker business. He also served on the Redwood Falls School Board.

In 1981, Governor Al Quie appointed Dirlam to serve on the Minnesota Board of Residential Utility Consumers, a position he held until 1985. He died in 1995 and was buried in Redwood Falls Cemetery.

References

External links

"Tribune of the people: the Minnesota Legislature and its leadership" – Aubrey Dirlam

1913 births
1995 deaths
People from Panora, Iowa
People from Redwood Falls, Minnesota
Farmers from Minnesota
School board members in Minnesota
Speakers of the Minnesota House of Representatives
Republican Party members of the Minnesota House of Representatives
20th-century American politicians